A.C.D. Pro Dronero is an Italian football club based in Dronero, Piedmont. Currently it plays in Italy's Serie D, the fourth-tier league.

History

Foundation
The club was founded in 1913.

Serie D
In the season 2012–13 the team was promoted for the first time, from Eccellenza Piedmont to Serie D.

Colors and badge
The team's color is red.

Honours
Eccellenza:
Play-off (1): 2012-13
Winner (1): 2017-18

References

External links
Official website 

Association football clubs established in 1913
Football clubs in Piedmont and Aosta Valley
1913 establishments in Italy